The public image of Recep Tayyip Erdoğan concerns the image of Recep Tayyip Erdoğan, current President of Turkey, among residents of Turkey and worldwide.

Rating and polls

International polling 
Opinions of Erdoğan from outside Turkey varies from region and time of his premiership or presidency. During the first years of his premiership in which Turkey reformed its law to comply with EU-accession talks, Erdogan received favorable ratings in Europe, calling the reforms a "silent revolution". The refugee crisis originating from the Syrian civil war lowered the ratings of Erdogan in Europe, while maintaining high support in the Arab world.

Comperative polling 
Erdoğan is the most popular world leader for Arab youths, according to the results of a poll, carried out by the Arab Barometer research network for BBC News Arabic. The survey polled the opinions of 25,000 youths across the Arab world on a wide variety of subjects.

Perception

Accusations of antisemitism 

Erdoğan referred to the Turkish novelist and Islamist ideologue, Necip Fazıl Kısakürek, as his muse. Kısakürek was regarded by some analysts, such as Günther Jikeli and Kemal Silay, as the source of his views on Jews. Kısakürek's publications included the Turkish translation of The Protocols of the Elders of Zion and praise for industrialist Henry Ford's The International Jew, as well as a political program in which he wrote: "Chief among these treacherous and insidious elements to be cleansed are the Dönmeh and the Jews". In 1974, as president of the Beyoğlu Youth Group of the Islamist MSP Party, Erdoğan wrote, directed and played the lead role in a play titled "Mas-Kom-Ya" (Mason-Komünist-Yahudi [Mason-Communist-Jew]), which presented freemasonry, communism and Judaism as evil. A 2009 report issued by the Israeli Foreign Ministry, said that Erdoğan "indirectly incites and encourages" antisemitism. In 2013, Erdoğan was placed second on the Simon Wiesenthal Center's list of the year's top ten antisemitic personalities, after Erdoğan blamed the "interest rate lobby" as organizers of the mass protests against him in cities around the country in June 2013. In another quote that was regarded as antisemitic, he said "When the word ‘media’ is pronounced, Israel and Israel's administration comes to mind. They have the ability to manipulate it as they wish". He then claimed that not only the international press but also Turkish newspapers were run by Israel. During the campaign for the Turkish elections in June 2015, Erdoğan accused The New York Times of being represented by "Jewish capital" after foreign media outlets expressed concern over the corrosion of freedom of expression in Turkey.

As a younger man, in 1974, Erdogan wrote, directed, and gave himself the lead role in the play Mas-Kom-Ya, which presented freemasonry, communism, and Judaism as world evils. The play features a Muslim factory worker, who sent his son to Europe where the son became influenced by the West, ultimately ending with a Jewish "agitator" posing as a Muslim Turk and inciting the workers against the factory owner, who dies; at one climactic moment, a devoutly Muslim character shouts "all evil regimes are inventions of Jews!"

When during a televised press conference he was asked if he believed a presidential system was possible in a unitary state. Erdoğan affirmed this and cited Nazi Germany as an example of how this is possible. However, the Turkish president's office said that Erdoğan was not advocating a Hitler-style government when he called for a state system with a strong executive. Furthermore, that the Turkish president had declared the Holocaust, anti-semitism and Islamophobia as crimes against humanity and that it was out of the question for him to cite Hitler's Germany as a good example.

In 2014, in response to the Soma mining disaster which killed 300 people, pro-Erdogan Islamist media accused the "Jewish media" and Israel for culpability, and Erdogan himself was filmed saying "why are you running away, spawn of Israel", in what was considered a "clear anti-Semitic slur" by Kemal Silay and Gunther Jikeli.

Neo-Ottomanism 
As President, Erdoğan has overseen a revival of Ottoman tradition, greeting Palestinian President Mahmoud Abbas with an Ottoman-style ceremony in the new presidential palace, with guards dressed in costumes representing founders of 16 Great Turkish Empires in history. While serving as the Prime Minister of Turkey, Erdoğan's AKP made references to the Ottoman era during election campaigns, such as calling their supporters 'grandsons of Ottomans' (Osmanlı torunu). This proved controversial, since it was perceived to be an open attack against the republican nature of modern Turkey founded by Mustafa Kemal Atatürk. In 2015, Erdoğan made a statement in which he endorsed the old Ottoman term külliye to refer to university campuses rather than the standard Turkish word kampüs. Many critics have thus accused Erdoğan of wanting to become an Ottoman sultan and abandon the secular and democratic credentials of the Republic. When pressed on this issue in January 2015, Erdoğan denied these claims and said that he would aim to be more like Queen Elizabeth II of the United Kingdom rather than like an Ottoman sultan.

Anti-smoking activism 
He is a well known anti-smoking activist, and often approaches people he sees smoking aiming for them to quit it. During his international journey to the 77th United Nations assembly he collected a cigarette pack of a smoker in the Central Park in New York, and Daily Sabah also reported that he compelled the Foreign Minister of Hungary Daniel Mitov to quit smoking during the NATO summit in Warsaw, Poland. Erdoğan usually demands the smoker to sign the cigarette package he carries, and following deliver it to him. In 2009 his Government passed a law which prohibits smoking in public places and in 2010, he was awarded the "WHO Director-General Special Recognition Award" for his anti smoking activism. On occasion of the Turkish Quit Smoking Day in 2016, an exhibition with the cigarette boxes he had collected so far was displayed at the Presidential Palace.

References 

Recep Tayyip Erdoğan
Erdoğan, Recep Tayyip